Countess Praskovya Alexandrovna Hendrikova (née Princess Khilkova;   – ) was a Lady-in-waiting to Empress Maria Feodorovna, a favorite of Grand Duke Michael Pavlovich of Russia, the sister of military general Prince Stepan Khilkov, and head of the Elizabethan Institute Lyubov Bezobrazova.

Biography 
Hendrikova was born to Prince Alexander Yakovlevich Khilkov (1755–1819) and his second wife, Baroness Feodosia Ivanovna Mestmakher. She was born in St. Petersburg, and baptized on June 29, 1802 in the Simeonov Church in the presence of her maternal grandfather, Baron Ivan Ivanovich Mestmakher, who at the time was the Russian ambassador to Dresden, and Princess Maria Khilkova. She was educated at the Catherine Institute, from which she graduated in 1820 with a large gold cipher. Empress Maria Feodorovna spoke about her to the entire institute “Donnez plus souvent des Paulette Hilkoff” (Take an example from Paulette Khilkova).

Relationship with Grand Duke Mikhail 
At the end of her studies, she was appointed Lady-in-waiting at the Imperial court, where she soon became a universal favorite. She danced and sang beautifully at musical evenings. Vasily Zhukovsky was fond her, as can be seen from the entries in his diary, he dedicated poems to her "Is it a sin for you, beautiful countess..." 

“The beauty of Khilkova and her pleasant mind enchanted the whole court,” recalled Baron MA Korf, “one of her zealous admirers was the single and then young Grand Duke Mikhail Pavlovich”.

“Pasha was more than beautiful,” wrote the memoirist Alexandra Smirnova, “she had an expression of infinite tenderness, a small upturned nose that gave her the appearance of a playful child, a very small mouth, a large cherry could not pass through these thin lips. She had a carefree look, her gray eyes were kind ... Everyone liked all this together, and especially the poor Grand Duke, so humble.” 

At first it was an ordinary crush, but soon it grew into an ardent passion, and the Grand Duke decided to formally ask for the hand of Princess Khilkova. The insistent demands of Mikhail Pavlovich excited the whole court and the royal house. Alexander I of Russia sympathised with his brother. The Emperor was inclined to agree, but Dowager Empress Maria Feodorovna remained adamant. “My child,” she said, “do as you want, but before you is a bad example of Konstantin.”

Princess Khilkova threw herself at the feet of the empress, saying that there was never any assistance on her part to arouse the passion of the Grand Duke and, as proof, asked permission to leave her place. This worked and soon Mikhail Pavlovich left for Stuttgart to meet his future wife, and Praskovya remained at court. On 6 October 1823, she sang "with excellent art and pleasantness" at a musical evening in Gatchina on the occasion of the arrival of Elena Pavlovna. Three years later, Princess Khilkova married a young and wealthy Guards officer, Count Alexander Ivanovich Hendrikov (1807–1881).

Marriage and Children 

Their wedding took place on November 3, 1826 in the Court Cathedral in the Winter Palace. “Pashinka Khilkova has been Countess Gendrikova for a week now,” wrote Alexandra Voeikova, “and they say she is very pleased and happy”. After her husband's resignation, she lived in Kharkiv from 1832. At the ball given on the occasion of the arrival of Tsarevich Alexander in the city on October 12, 1837, Countess Gendrikova, as Semyon Yurievich, was "a la tete de la societe de Kharkov" (at the head of society of Kharkov) and danced with the heir. Together, they had three sons and one daughter:

 Alexander (1827–1851; lieutenant, mortally wounded in a duel by Baron E.O. Rosen)
 Dmitry (1831–1898; Lieutenant General)
 Stepan (1832–1901; privy councilor)
 Anna (1830–1886; Lady-in-waiting, married to the Ryazan governor N. A. Boldarev)

Illness and Death 
The Hendrikovs enjoyed the favor of Grand Duchess Elena Pavlovna. In 1841, she persuaded the count to accept the post Equerry, which gave them weekly access to the courtyard. The change in the favorable climate of Kharkiv to Saint Petersburg had a detrimental effect on the health of Praskovya, and she was constantly ill.
At the beginning of 1843, her disease worsened. She was visited daily by the Grand Duke Mikhail Pavlovich and very often by the Empress. In addition to high society, the whole city knew about her imminent death, seeing every day the royal carriages at her entrance. On March 12, 1843, she died of pneumonia. The whole court came to say goodbye to the body, the emperor was the last just before the removal, and Grand Duke Mikhail Pavlovich was at the funeral service in St. Isaac's Cathedral. He grieved for several days and made no appearances. “I love her more than anything else and I will love her until my last breath,” the Grand Duke said. The body of Countess Hendrikova was taken to the Kharkiv estate of her husband in the village of Grafskoe, Volchansk district, and buried under St. Andrew's Church.

References 

Russian princesses
Countesses of the Russian Empire
1802 births
1843 deaths
Praskovya